William Levi Dawson (September 26, 1899 – May 2, 1990) was an American composer, choir director, professor, and musicologist.

Life
Of African American heritage, Dawson was born in Anniston, Alabama. In 1912, Dawson ran away from home to study music full-time as a pre-college student at the Tuskegee Institute (now University) under the tutelage of school president Booker T. Washington. Dawson paid his tuition by being a music librarian and manual laborer working in the school’s Agricultural Division. He also participated as a member of Tuskegee’s choir, band and orchestra, composing and traveling extensively with the Tuskegee Singers for five years; he had learned to play most of the instruments by the time he completed his studies in 1921. A graduate of the Horner Institute of Fine Arts with a Bachelor of Music, William Dawson later studied at the Chicago Musical College with professor Felix Borowski, and then at the American Conservatory of Music where he received his master's degree. Early in his career, he served as a trombonist both with the Redpath Chautauqua and the Civic Orchestra of Chicago (1927–1930).  His teaching career began in the Kansas City public school system, followed by a tenure with the Tuskegee Institute from 1931–1956. During this period, he appointed a large number of faculty members who later became well known for their work in the field. Additionally, Dawson also developed the Tuskegee Institute Choir into an internationally renowned ensemble; they were invited to sing at New York City's Radio City Music Hall in 1932 for a week of six daily performances.

Dawson began composing at a young age, and early in his compositional career, his Trio for Violin, Cello, and Piano was performed by the Kansas City Symphony. Besides chamber music, he is also known for his contributions to both orchestral and choral literature. His best-known works are arrangements of and variations on spirituals. His Negro Folk Symphony of 1934 garnered a great deal of attention at its world premiere by Leopold Stokowski and the Philadelphia Orchestra. The symphony was revised in 1952 with added African rhythms inspired by the composer's trip to West Africa. Dawson said that the composition was an attempt to convey the missing elements that had been lost when Africans came into bondage outside their homeland. The piece would go on to be his only symphony. Following it's premiere, it was performed a few times in the span of 18 months before it was forgotten for decades. 86 years later, in June of 2020, the piece was recorded by the ORF Vienna Radio Symphony Orchestra. On February, 02 2023, after 89 years, the symphony was performed by the Philadelphia Orchestra for the second time since its premiere, under director Yannick Nezet Seguin. His most popular spirituals include "Ezekiel Saw the Wheel", "Jesus Walked the Lonesome Valley", "Talk about a Child That Do Love Jesus", and "King Jesus Is a-Listening". Dawson was elected to the Alpha Alpha chapter of Phi Mu Alpha Sinfonia, the music fraternity, in 1977. He died at the age 90, in Montgomery, Alabama, and is buried in the Tuskegee University cemetery.

Dawson's arrangements of traditional African-American spirituals are widely published in the United States and are regularly performed by school, college and community choral programs. According to Dominique-René de Lerma of Lawrence University, in notes to "The Spirituals of William L. Dawson" produced by The St Olaf Choir in 1997, "What is even more striking than the richness of Dawson's textures is the lushness of his sonorities, exhibiting his remarkable insight into vocal potentials."

Dawson married pianist Cornelia Lampton in 1927; she died in 1928.

Honors
 Honorary Doctor of Music, Tuskegee Institute, 1956.
 Dawson received the University of Pennsylvania Glee Club Award of Merit on Feb. 25, 1968, in honor of his contribution to music for male choruses.
 Alabama Arts Hall of Fame, 1975.
 Honorary doctorate, Lincoln University, 1978.
 Alabama Arts Award, 1980.
 Honorary doctorate, Ithaca College, 1982.
 Alumni Merit Award, Tuskegee Institute, 1983.
 Alabama Music Hall of Fame, 1989 Inductee.
 Alabama Music Educators Association Hall of Fame, Inaugural class of 2008.
 American Choral Directors Association Wall of Honor.

Notable works

 Out in the Fields (1928)
 Negro Folk Symphony (1934)
 I. The Bond of Africa
 II.  Hope in the Night
 III. O Let Me Shine!
 Soon Ah Will Be Done (1934)
 Jesus Walked the Lonesome Valley
 King Jesus Is a-Listening
 Talk about a Child That Do Love Jesus
 There is a Balm in Gilead (1939)
 Steal Away (1942)
 Every Time I Feel the Spirit (1946)
 Swing Low (1946)
 Mary Had a Baby (1947) Christmas spiritual, dedicated to Robert Shaw
 Ain'a That Good News (1967)
 ''Ezekiel Saw The Wheel"

References

External links
 William Levi Dawson's archives
 

1899 births
1990 deaths
20th-century classical composers
20th-century American composers
20th-century American male musicians
African-American classical composers
American classical composers
African-American male classical composers
American male classical composers
20th-century African-American musicians